Compression members are structural elements that are pushed together or carry a load; more technically, they are subjected only to axial compressive forces. That is, the loads are applied on the longitudinal axis through the centroid of the member cross section, and the load over the cross-sectional area gives the stress on the compressed member.

In buildings, posts and columns are almost always compression members, as are the top chord of trusses.

Description
For a compression member, such as a column, the principal stress comes mainly from axial forces, that is forces that fall along one line, usually the centerline. The loading capacity of a short column is determined by the strength limit of the material. The strength of a column of intermediate size is limited by its degree of inelasticity. A long column is constrained by the elastic limit (that is by the amount of buckling).

See also
Arch
Brown truss
List of structural elements
Strut

Notes

External links
Columns and other compression members
Bicycle compression members
Numerical load numbers for reinforced concrete compression members

Columns and entablature